Roland's Breach is the name of a natural gap, 40 m across and 100 m high, at an elevation of 2804 m in the Pyrenees on the border of Aragón, northern Spain, and Hautes-Pyrénées, France.

The gap is situated in the Ordesa y Monte Perdido National Park on the Franco-Spanish border, close to the steep cliffs of the Cirque de Gavarnie.

According to one legend Roland's Breach was cut by Count Roland with his sword Durendal in an attempt to destroy the sword, after being defeated during the Battle of Roncesvalles in 778. Cornered at Salto de Roldán, he escaped by leaping the chasm on horseback from one of the crags to the other; the horse died in the attempt. Roland continued northward on foot, and smote the Pyrenees with his sword to create Roland's Breach, so that he could see France one last time before he died.

The gap can be reached from the Refugio Sarradets, a nearby mountain shelter, in about an hour's climb.

The provenance of this myth is unclear as the Cirque du Gavarnie is approximately 150km East South East from the Roncesvaux Pass where the legend of Roland is based.

Gallery

References

External links
 "La Brecha de Rolando" summitpost.org, retrieved 2013-08-20 (in French)
 "Taillón (3.144m) por la Brecha de Rolando" rutaspirineos.org, retrieved 2013-08-20 (in Spanish)
 Otras bellas fotos de la brecha de Rolando

Breach
Mountain passes of Aragon
Mountain passes of Spain
Mountain passes of the Pyrenees
Mountain passes of Hautes-Pyrénées
France–Spain border crossings
Tourist attractions in Hautes-Pyrénées